The name Gautam (also transliterated as 
Gautama or Gauthama and a vrddhi patronymic of Gotama) is one of the ancient Indian names and is derived from the Sanskrit roots "gŐ(गः)" and "tama (तम)". "Tama" means "darkness" and "gŐ" means inter alia "bright light". Together they indicate  one, who dispels darkness (i.e., ignorance) by his brilliance (i.e., spiritual knowledge).

The name Gautam is a masculine name. The feminine counterpart is known as Gautami.

Credited to the great sage, a descendant of Maharishi Āngira, the name Gautam might have come into limelight first during the Vedic period. There were several great and renowned rishis, who belonged to the Gautam gotra but all of them assumed the generic name of Gautam only. The name had a conjuring effect by virtue of the merits of the great Vedic rishi Gautam and his illustrious descendant rishis so much so that, numerous other persons sought to assume this name in ancient times.

The author of the Dharamasutra was the son or grandson of the sage Aucathya, and the grandson or great-grandson of sage Auśanasa. The aphoristic law-book, usually attributed to the Maharishi Gautam, is in reality a manual belonging to a Gautam Karana (i.e., sage Kareṇupāli). The Vaṃsa Brāhmaṅa of the Sāmaveda enumerates four members of the Gautam family among the teachers, viz. Gâtri, Sumantra Bâbhrava, Saṃkara, and Râdha, who handed down the third Veda and all were referred to as Gautam.

The Rigveda Samhita and the Sathapatha Brāhmaṅa of the Śukla Yajurveda mentions one Gautam as a son of Rāhúgaṇa, the chief priest of the Royal family of Kuru empire, who himself was addressed as Gautam. The Vālmiki Ramāyana mentions a Maharishi Gautam, who had his hermitage in Mithila where he lived with his wife, Ahalya. The Vayu Puraṇa refers to a sage named Akṣapāda, who was the conceiver of the Nyāya philosophy, as Maharishi Gautam. Akṣapāda was the same as Ahalya’s husband Maharishi Gautam of Mithila.

Nodha, a son of Maharishi Gautam, who was attributed to the creation of several hymns of Rigveda, was also called as Gautam. The Chandogya Upanishad of the Sāmaveda mentions another teacher named Haridrumata as Gautam. The Kathopanishad of the Ḳrsna Yajurveda mentions the sage Nachiketa, who conversed with Yama on the mystery of life, as Gautam; which evidently was a generic name as his father is also mentioned as Gautam in the same text. The great Sanskrit poet Kalidasa, following the Adhyatma Ramayana, described a sage Dirghatapas (i.e., one in deep penance) as Gautam.

Some other rishis, who were also mentioned as Gautam, were - Devabaagar,  Aruni Uddālaka, Svētaketu, Chirakaaree, Kripāchariya, Ekadan, Dvidan, and Tridan.

A Gautam gotriya Brahmin named, Indrabhuti of Gochchar village of the ancient Magadha kingdom, who became the chief disciple of Lord Mahavira, the 24th Jain Tirthankara, was called as Gautam Swami.

Siddhartha (founder of Buddhism) was born in the Shakya clan that belonged to the warrior (Kṣatriya) caste. He was called Gautama to perpetuate the name of his foster mother Gautami for the love she bestowed on him

The current naming practices in India can be traced to the massive advent of European in India during the 18th century.  Since the intractability of the Indian naming methods and their meanings confounded the Europeans, they supposedly introduced the naming method of having first name, middle name, and surname in their urge to influence, modernize and develop the Indian system accordingly.

References

External links
 Gotras, http://www.salagram.net/Gotras.html.
 Gautam Swami, http://www.jainbelief.com/Gautam.htm.
 Stenzler, Adolf Friedrich; Editor. Śrīgautamadharmaśāstram: The institutes of Gautam. Trűbner, London, UK, 1876.
 Narayanan, Srinivas. The Necessity of Naming: Or What's in A Name: or Rainy Days or An Inquiry Into The Origins of Indian Naming Systems: Or An Empty Mind Is A Devil's Workshop: Or Some Other Catchy Interesting Erudite Title Yet (SOCIETY). http://www.icsi.berkeley.edu/~snarayan/names.

 Vedas
 Dharmaśāstra
 Saptarishi